Scorzoneroides or hawkbits is a genus of plants of the tribe Cichorieae within the family Asteraceae.

Scorzoneroides used to be included in the genus Leontodon. Recent molecular studies revealed that Leontodon in the older, broader sense  is an unnatural adhesion of two separate groupings. Therefore, the former subgenus Oporinia of the genus Leontodon had to be resurrected as a separate genus.

Secondary metabolites
In some members of the genus Scorzoneroides, germacranolides and costus lactone-type guaianolides were detected. The genus is a rich source of hieracin-type and lactucin-type guaianolides.

Phenolics found in flowering heads of Scorzoneroides taxa include luteolin type flavonoids and caffeoyl quinic acid derivatives such as chlorogenic acid and 3,5-dicaffeoylquinic acid. Moreover, Scorzoneroides are source species of caffeoyl tartaric acid derivatives caffeoyl tartaric acid and cichoric acid.

Species
 accepted species

References

Cichorieae
Asteraceae genera